The American Thoracic Society (ATS) is a nonprofit organization focused on improving care for pulmonary diseases, critical illnesses and sleep-related breathing disorders. It was established in 1905 as the 

American Sanatorium Association, and changed its name in 1938 to the American Trudeau Society. In 1960, it changed its name again to the American Thoracic Society.  Originally the medical section of the American Lung Association, the Society became independently incorporated in 2000 as a 501 (c) (3) organization.

Medical and scientific areas of interest
Pulmonology, critical care, sleep medicine, infectious disease, pediatrics, allergy/immunology, thoracic surgery, behavioral science, environmental and occupational medicine, physiology, molecular biology, among others.

Membership
More than 15,000 physicians, research scientists, and nurses and other allied healthcare professionals (32 percent of whom work outside the United States).

ATS Assemblies
The interests of members are represented by the Society's 14 specialty-specific assemblies and 2 sections.

Chapters and activities
With the overarching goal of advancing the Society's mission, each chapter represents a state or other geographical area and includes, in its membership ATS members. The ATS also works to engage its members around the globe.

Publications and educational activities
4 peer-reviewed journals:

American Journal of Respiratory and Critical Care Medicine
American Journal of Respiratory Cell and Molecular Biology
Annals of the American Thoracic Society
ATS Scholar

The Society offers Continuing medical education credits and nursing contact hours through its annual international conference.

The ATS advocates for improved respiratory health for patients in the United States and around the globe. The Society is actively involved securing funds for basic and clinical research, establishing global tuberculosis and tobacco control policies, enforcing the Clean Air Act, and lobbying for fair reimbursement for physician services under Medicare and other insurers.

The ATS Patient Information Series is available electronically on the ATS website.

See also
American Lung Association
Edward Livingston Trudeau

References

External links
American Thoracic Society
American Journal of Respiratory and Critical Care Medicine (AJRCCM)
American Journal of Respiratory Cell and Molecular Biology (AJRCMB)
Annals of the American Thoracic Society (AnnalsATS)

Medical associations based in the United States
Respiratory therapy
Pulmonology and respiratory therapy organizations
Organizations established in 1905
Medical and health organizations based in New York (state)
1905 establishments in the United States